Francis Booker (8 October 1746 – 13 November 1806) was an English first-class cricketer who played at the end of the 18th century.

Booker was born at Eynsford near Sevenoaks in Kent in 1746. He lived his whole life in the village and kept the Soho Inn. A left-handed batsman, Booker played in a total of 45 first-class matches between 1773 and 1790. He played 23 of these for Kent sides as well as two for West Kent and two for sides organised by Kent patron the Duke of Dorset. Another 12 were played for England sides.

He was briefly mentioned in John Nyren's book, The Cricketers of My Time, described as one of three players Nyren considered to be "excellent and steady batters, strong hitters, and sure fields". He was noted as a fine hitter of the ball and as a very good outfielder. He was rated a good single wicket player. He scored 835 first-class runs and took at least seven wickets.

Booker died in 1806 at Eynsford. He was 60 years of age.

Notes

References

English cricketers
Kent cricketers
English cricketers of 1701 to 1786
1746 births
1806 deaths
English cricketers of 1787 to 1825
Left-Handed v Right-Handed cricketers
Non-international England cricketers
West Kent cricketers
People from Eynsford